Velidi Lakshman (born 6 July 1991) is an Indian cricketer. He made his first-class debut for Tamil Nadu in the 2017–18 Ranji Trophy on 9 November 2017.

References

External links
 

1991 births
Living people
Indian cricketers
Cricketers from Chennai
Tamil Nadu cricketers